The Tunes Liberia Music Awards (often simply the TMLA Awards) is a Liberian music awards ceremony organized annually for musical achievement in the Liberia  music industry, the awards ceremony was established in 2018. The winners receive a gold-plated statuette.

See also
Website

References

Awards established in 2018
African music awards